"Let Me Try" is a song by  Luminiţa Anghel and Sistem.

Let Me Try may also refer to:
"Let Me Try", a 1965 song by Barry Gordon
"Let Me Try", a 1970 song by MC5
"Let Me Try", a 1992 song by Randy Travis
"Let Me Try", a 1989 song by Ken Laszlo